Attorney General Terrell may refer to:

Joseph M. Terrell (1861–1912), Attorney General of Georgia
George Whitfield Terrell (1803–1846), Attorney General of the Republic of Texas